Douglas E. Lynch is an academic administrator and education entrepreneur who has made significant contributions to education innovation and also sparked controversy.

Background 
Lynch holds a B.A. in economics from Arizona State University, an M.B.A. in International Finance from the Stern School of Business at New York University, and an M.Phil. and Ph.D. in Economics and Education from Columbia University.

Doug was the vice dean at the Graduate School of Education at the University of Pennsylvania and while there also served for a time as an academic director of Wharton Executive Education and a senior adviser to the Fels Institute of Government.  Prior to Penn, Doug was an assistant dean at New York University and before joining NYU, Doug worked at the College Board and Arizona State University.

Work in Education Innovation 
During his time at ASU, Lynch helped launch the Genesis Academy as a charter school; one of the first in the United States.  At NYU, Lynch became active in adult & continuing education with a specific focus on online education.  He was invited to present testimony to the U.S. Congress.  In 2002, Lynch's work at NYU in exporting education was recognized by the U.S. Department of Commerce though a President's "E" Award  in exporting; the first time a college was recognized for innovation in exporting.

At Penn he has launched a handful of new endeavors including the first joint doctoral program in work-based learning (with the Wharton School) and the executive masters for Teach for America corps members serving Philadelphia as well as an education business plan competition.  Lynch also launched GSE films and the first movie he produced won a "Teddy" Award for best documentary.  He also launched the NEST and the Milken Business Plan Competition, the largest education business plan competition in the world.  He was invited to serve on American Enterprise Institute's Future of Education Reform as well as Harvard's Futures of Education Reform Initiative.  In 2012, Lynch did a TED Talk on innovation and was also selected as one of the most important education scholars.

Work in Corporate Learning 
At NYU, Lynch created "Corporate Learning Services" to serve employers learning needs.  Working with Richard Breeden, Lynch designed and delivered all the training for WorldCom to help it emerge from sanctions and bankruptcy.  He also was brought in after 9/11 to help New York City Fire Department design programs.  At Penn, he created the first doctoral program designed for Chief Learning Officers.  He was the chair of the American Society for Training & Development Public Policy Committee,  and also chaired the US delegation to the International Standards Organization in an effort to establish global standards for all non-formal learning.  As an expert in corporate learning, Lynch also served for a time on the Board of Visitors to the Central Intelligence Agency's Corporate University.  In 2001, one of his programs at NYU won an HR Executive "Top 10" Award and in 2003, another program won an APX Award for Program.

Controversy 
In 2012, Lynch was accused of falsifying his doctorate, with an article alleging he claimed dates for a Masters in Philosophy that was not correct and for a PhD that he had not yet completed.  Lynch resigned one day after the story broke in the national press. Another article that followed the controversy noted that the Penn website did not list his degrees, only that on one Penn website he was referred to as "Dr." Lynch,  and in another article, it notes that he claimed he was "trained in economics" rather than having a doctorate.  The Penn Press release at the time of his hire, did not mention either degree but rather that he was enrolled in a doctoral program.  The controversy continued a year later,  where another article claimed that he continued to fake his degrees.  However, the Columbia University website at the time of the article did listed him as having a PhD and with a dissertation in economics that focused on the value of diversity.

References

Interviews and Citations in the Press
  CLO Magazine February 9, 2012. How ‘Failure Resumes’ Can Boost Leadership Development 
  CLO Magazine February 8, 2012. Follow The Leader: The Most Sought After Skills For Global Leaders 
  CLO Magazine, February 1, 2012. Back To School. Changes In Executive Education
  Learning Matters Podcast, December 6, 2012. Doug Lynch On Business And Education
  Education Week, June 13, 2011. Colleges Bid for NYC Space
  Education Week, January 25, 2011. The Next Iteration Of I3: From Symphony To Jazz? 
  Inside Higher Ed, June 14, 2011. Ed School Business
  Governing Magazine. October 2010. The Resilience Of Procurement Reform In Georgia
  USA Today. July 27, 2010. Programs, $650m Fund Help Entrepreneurs In Education Market
  E-School News. June 1, 2009. School Of The Future: Lessons In Failure
  Training & Development Magazine April 2009. The Long View: Doug Lynch
  Training & Development Magazine, March 2009. Leadership Development: One Size Does Not Fit All
  Workforce Magazine, March 2009. Tough Times Bring Clients To Disney's Training Business

1964 births
Academic scandals
University of Pennsylvania faculty
Living people
Arizona State University alumni
New York University Stern School of Business alumni
Columbia Graduate School of Arts and Sciences alumni
People who fabricated academic degrees